De duivel is a 1918 Dutch silent drama film directed by Theo Frenkel.

Cast
 Tonny Stevens - Henri de Vere
 Charles Mögle - J, Verburg
 Annie Wesling - Henriëtte van Marle
 Frits Bouwmeester
 Cor Smits
 Maurits Parser - Lablache
 Herman Schwab - De heer van Marle
 Lous van Korlaar-van Dam - Mevrouw van Marle
 Toon van Elsen
 Sylvain Poons - Barman in wit uniform
 Anton van Elsen
 Jo Vischer Sr.
 Hendrik Kammemeijer

References

External links 
 

Dutch silent feature films
1918 films
Dutch black-and-white films
1918 drama films
Films directed by Theo Frenkel
Dutch drama films
Silent drama films